Ian Victor Pearson (born 9 February 1934) is a former  Australian rules footballer who played with St Kilda and Hawthorn in the Victorian Football League (VFL).

Pearson is the younger brother of Neil Pearson who also played for Hawthorn.

Notes

External links 
 
 
 Ian Pearson at The VFA Project

Living people
1934 births
Australian rules footballers from Victoria (Australia)
St Kilda Football Club players
Hawthorn Football Club players